GWR 5542 is a preserved Great Western Railway steam locomotive of the GWR 4575 Class. It is currently based at South Devon Railway.

History
Number 5542 was built in 1928 for £3602. It was sold to for scrap to the Woodham Brothers in February 1962.

5542 appears in the TV series "Land Girls" in the episode "Destinies", originally aired on 11 September 2009.

Preservation

After many years in the scrapyard at Barry it was sold to the West Somerset Railway Association (WSRA) in 1976. In 1979 it was sold again to some members of the WSRA and entered service on the West Somerset Railway in 2002.

The 5542 Fund then continued as a support and fund raising body, which over the years has raised an average of £500 per month from a variety of fund raising initiatives. The website is currently hosting images of the boiler overhaul.

References

External links

 5542 website
 Photo of 5542

Preserved Great Western Railway steam locomotives
2-6-2T locomotives
Locomotives saved from Woodham Brothers scrapyard
Railway locomotives introduced in 1928
Standard gauge steam locomotives of Great Britain